

Events
Alfred Topliz, the Democratic leader of Manhattan's First Assembly and supposed associate of New York mobsters Michael "Trigger Mike" Coppola and Frank Erickson, appears before the New York Crime Commission. 
March 9 – A Brooklyn shoe salesman by the name of Arnold Schuster is killed, his death ordered Albert Anastasia for his role in the capture of bank robber Willie "The Actor" Sutton. Schuster's murder would bring unwanted attention and public scrutiny on organized crime.
March 18 – Joseph Vallone, former head of the Milwaukee crime family, dies. His successor Sam Ferrara, who had controlled the organization since Vallone's retirement in 1949, is forced by the Chicago Outfit to step down around November or December after a request by members of the criminal organization and replaced by John Alioto.
April 27 – Over 80 organized crime figures are observed attending a party, reportedly in celebration of Raymond L.S. Patriarca's appointment as head the New England crime family, having succeeded Philip Buccola, who had fled to Italy following a tax evasion investigation.
May – A conference is held by the National Crime Syndicate in the Florida Keys.
August 15 – Frank Costello is convicted of contempt of court, after walking out during his testimony before the Kefauver Committee, and sentenced to 18 months imprisonment.

Arts and literature

Births
Vincent C. Geoachinni, Patriarca crime family soldier
Rene Martin Verdugo Urquiquez, Guadalajara drug cartel member
December 3 – Benjamín Arellano Félix, Mexican drug lord and Tijuana Cartel member

Deaths
March 9 – Arnold Schuster, Brooklyn salesman and murder victim 
March 18 – Joseph Vallone, Milwaukee crime family leader 
December 29 – Phillip D'Andrea, Chicago Outfit member

Organized crime
Years in organized crime